Ignacia Reachy (1816–1866) was a soldier during the War of Intervention.

Biography
Reachy was born in Guadalajara, Mexico in 1816. Reachy formed a women's battalion to help defend Guadalajara from the French during the War of Intervention (1861-1866). Soon after, Reachy left Guadalajara to join the Army of the East and many male officers gifted to her military gear and attire because she was considered a "valiant woman patriot". On 28 April 1862, Reachy showed her true bravery; Reachy was captured by the French while trying to cover and protect the retreat of Arteaga. Reachy was imprisoned for a year, before escaping then going back to Arteaga for more orders. Reachy was made Commander of the Lancers of Jalisco until she was killed in battle in 1866.

References 

1816 births
1866 deaths
Mexican soldiers
Mexican prisoners of war
Prisoners of war held by France
Women soldiers
People from Guadalajara, Jalisco